Kate Royal (born 1979) is an English lyric soprano. She is the daughter of Steve Royal, a singer and songwriter for television, and of Carolyn Royal, a former model and dancer.

Royal was born in London and attended Talbot Heath School in Bournemouth, Dorset. Her teachers as a youth included Jon Andrew. She later studied at the Guildhall School of Music and Drama and then the National Opera Studio, graduating in the summer of 2004. In that same year, she won the Kathleen Ferrier Award.

Royal began to attract wider notice as an understudy for the role of Pamina in Mozart's Die Zauberflöte at Glyndebourne Festival Opera in 2004, when she replaced the lead soprano at one performance. With Glyndebourne on Tour, she has sung the Countess in Le nozze di Figaro. She has performed in recital with the pianists Graham Johnson and Roger Vignoles. In 2006 with Glyndebourne on Tour, she sang The Governess in Benjamin Britten's The Turn of the Screw. Later the same year, she signed a recording contract with EMI Classics, and her first disc of songs and arias was released in September 2007. She dedicates five months per year to song recitals.

Royal and her husband, the actor and singer Julian Ovenden, have a son, Johnny Beau, born in October 2009. The couple married in December 2010, officiated by Ovenden's father, Canon John Ovenden, who also christened their son in a double ceremony. Their daughter, Audrey, was born in November 2011.

Discography
Solo
Kate Royal: Academy of St Martin in the Fields, Edward Gardner (EMI Classics, 2007)
The Songs of Robert Schumann Vol. 10: Eichendorff Liederkreis, Op 39, with Graham Johnson, Felicity Lott, and Ann Murray (Hyperion, 2007)
Midsummer Night: Orchestra of English National Opera & Crouch End Festival Chorus, Edward Gardner (2007) EMI Records Ltd. Barcode 0094639441952
A Lesson in Love, with Malcolm Martineau (piano) (EMI 2010)
Other
Ian Bostridge featuring Kate Royal: Great Handel (EMI Classics, 2007)
Paul McCartney featuring Kate Royal: Ecce Cor Meum (EMI Classics, 2006)
Choir of King's College, Cambridge featuring Kate Royal: Purcell: Music for Queen Mary
DVD Paul McCartney: Ecce Cor Meum (2007)
DVD Mozart: Die Zauberflöte, 2013 Easter Festival in Baden-Baden (2013)

References

External links

Profile, Askonas Holt
Schedule at Operabase
Profile, discography, Hyperion Records
Discography, Presto Classical
Kate Royal official MySpace music page
, "Eternal source of light divine" from Handel's Ode for the Birthday of Queen Anne, Orchestra of the Age of Enlightenment (2007)

1979 births
Living people
Alumni of the Guildhall School of Music and Drama
English operatic sopranos
Place of birth missing (living people)
People educated at Talbot Heath School
21st-century British  women opera singers